Percy Wilson (1879–1944) was an American botanist. 

He joined the New York Botanical Gardens as a museum aide.  Wilson then became the assistant to Nathaniel Lord Britton, the NYBG Director-in-Chief.  In 1914 Wilson became an Associate Curator.

In 1917, Wilson authored The Vegetation of Vieques Island.

References 

1879 births
1944 deaths
20th-century American botanists
Date of birth missing
Date of death missing
Place of birth missing
Place of death missing
New York Botanical Garden